Kezsky District (Kez joros) is an administrative and municipal district (raion), one of the twenty-five in the Udmurt Republic, Russia. It is located in the northeast of the republic. Its administrative center is the rural locality (a settlement) of Kez. Population:  26,446 (2002 Census);  The population of Kez accounts for 48.4% of the district's total population.

Geography
The source of the Kama River is located in the district. Other rivers of note include the Lyp, the Pyzep, and others.

Demographics 
Ethnic composition:
Udmurts: 68%
Russians: 30%
Tatars: 1%

References

Sources

Districts of Udmurtia